Mnesarchella fusilella is a species of primitive moths in the family Mnesarchaeidae. It is endemic to New Zealand and can be found in the Northland, Auckland, Waikato, Bay of Plenty, Hawke's Bay, Whanganui, and Wellington regions. It prefers well lit damp forests or moist fern-covered banks and lives at altitudes ranging from sea-level to approximately 500 m. Adults are on the wing from October to December. This species is normally day flying but males have been collected at night via light trapping.

Taxonomy 
This species was first described by Francis Walker in 1864 and named Tinea fusilella. In 1988 J. S. Dugdale placed this species within the Mnesarchaea genus. In 2019 George William Gibbs and Niels Peder Kristensen undertook a review of species within the family Mnesarchaeidae and placed this species within the newly described Mnesarchella genus. The male holotype specimen was collected in Auckland by Lt Col Daniel Bolton, RE, and held at the Natural History Museum, London.

Description 

Walker originally described the species as follows: 
Although M. fusilella is similar in appearance to M. loxoscia it can be distinguished as the former species has white patches under its head and on parts of the forewing. However specimens in Northland can be more difficult to distinguish as they can appear very similar to M. loxoscia. Females can also be difficult to distinguish as their colouration may again be similar to M. loxoscia.

Distribution 

This species is endemic to New Zealand. It is found in the Northland, Auckland, Waikato, Bay of Plenty, Hawke's Bay, Whanganui, and Wellington regions.

Habitat 
M. fusilella prefers well lit damp forests or moist fern-covered banks. It lives at altitudes ranging from sea-level to approximately 500 m.

Behaviour 
Adults of this species are on the wing from October to December. This species is normally day flying but males have been collected at night via light trapping. Males fly more frequently than females and mating has been observed before midday.

References

Moths described in 1864
Endemic fauna of New Zealand
Moths of New Zealand
Mnesarchaeoidea
Taxa named by Francis Walker (entomologist)
Endemic moths of New Zealand